Ouaninou (also spelled Waninou) is a town in northwest Ivory Coast. It is a sub-prefecture of and the seat of Ouaninou Department in Bafing Region, Woroba District. Ouaninou is also a commune.
In 2014, the population of the sub-prefecture of Ouaninou was 20,790.

Villages
The forty-one villages of the sub-prefecture of Ouaninou and their population in 2014 are:
 Binvè (489)
 Férentella (885)
 Ganhoué (1 201)
 Konigoro 1 (307)
 Kozéma (263)
 Lahidougou (110)
 Oualou-Ganhoué (164)
 Ouaninou (6 899)
 Sèfina (353)
 Silakoro-Ganhoué (169)
 Sinkoro (495)
 Tirikoro (901)
 Toubako-Ganhoué (101)
 Toutié (479)
 Vahidougou (514)
 Babadougou (312)
 Bassam (109)
 Bayola (461)
 Békosso (478)
 Bondounlo (106)
 Bounda (555)
 Faala (485)
 Goloutoulo (1 028)
 Gooko (158)
 Guê (128)
 Konigoro 2 (46)
 Koungbèkoro (440)
 Mamouesso (105)
 Méhidougou (141)
 Ohidougou (199)
 Ouintoulo (143)
 Sakofè (260)
 Sanandougou (231)
 Sérifoula (381)
 Sidougou-Ganhoué (55)
 Tiahoué (740)
 Tiékomandougou (101)
 Tiénivè (115)
 Tika (131)
 Tounvé (322)
 Vacérisso (230

Notes

Sub-prefectures of Bafing Region
Communes of Bafing Region